St. Davids is a small rural community in United Counties of Prescott and Russell, Ontario.  St. Davids is located approximately 6 km from the border with Quebec and approximately 5 km south of Voyageur Provincial Park.

Communities in the United Counties of Prescott and Russell